The 2018–19 season of the Turkish Women's First Football League is the 23rd season of Turkey's premier women's football league.

The league season started with the first week matches on 21 October 2018. The regular season concluded with the 18th week matches on 28 April. 2019. Ten teams competed with two promoted teams, ALG Spor of Gaziantep and Hakkarigücü Spor  from Hakkari, which replace the relegated teams 1207 Antalyaspor and İlkadım Belediyesi Yabancılar Pazarı Spor from Samsun. Four teams from Istanbul continued to take part in the 2018–19 season. As the teams Beşiktaş J.K. and ALG Spor finished the regular season equal on points, a play-off match was scheduled at aneutral venue. Beşiktaş J.K. became champion after defeating ALG Spor in the play-off match with 1–0. According to the reglement change by the Turkish Football Federation on 1 October 2019, the number of teams in the Women's First League was increased from ten to twelve. Contrary to former reglement, no teams should relegate in the upcoming season. However, Trabzon İO relegated as they did not show up in the entire season.

Teams

Team changes

League table

Results

1 – won by default
2 – default

Top goalscorers

.

Hat-tricks

References

2018
2018–19 domestic women's association football leagues
Women's First League